Super League XXVII is the 2022 season of the Super League, and 127th season of rugby league in Great Britain. The season began on 10 February 2022.

The full fixture list was released on 25 November 2021, with defending champions St Helens, starting their title defence against last year's finalists Catalans Dragons (a repeat of the 2021 Super League Grand Final), whilst Huddersfield Giants are set to take on newly promoted Toulouse Olympique.

All times (including matches played in France) are UK local time; GMT (UTC±00:00) until 26 March, BST (UTC+01:00) thereafter.

Regular season

Round 1

Round 2

Round 3

Round 4

Round 5

Round 6

Round 7

Round 8

(Maundy Thursday/Good Friday/Rivals Round)

Round 9
(Easter Monday)

Round 10

Round 11

Round 12

Round 13

Round 14

Round 15

Round 16

Round 17

Round 18 (Magic Weekend)

Round 19

Round 20

Round 21

Round 22

Round 23

Round 24

Round 25

Round 26

Round 27

Play-offs

Team bracket

Week 1: Eliminators

Week 2: Semi-finals

Week 3: Grand Final

Notes

References

2022 in English rugby league
Super League XXVII